The Helen and Kurt Wolff Translator's Prize is an annual literary prize named for the German–American publishers Helen and Kurt Wolff "honoring an outstanding literary translation from German into English" published in the USA the previous year. 

The translator of the winning translation receives $10,000. The prize was established in 1996 and is funded by the German government. It was administered by the Goethe-Institut of Chicago until 2014.  Since 2015, the prize has been administered by the New York Goethe-Institut.

Recipients

References

External links 
  

German literary awards
American literary awards
Translation awards
Awards established in 1996
Goethe-Institut
1996 establishments in the United States